The 2010–11 Air Force Falcons men's basketball team represented at the Air Force Academy. Led by fourth year head coach Jeff Reynolds. They played their home games at the Clune Arena on at the Air Force Academy's main campus in Colorado Springs, Colorado and are a member of the Mountain West Conference. They finished the season 16–16, 6–10 in Mountain West play and lost in the quarterfinals of the 2011 Mountain West Conference men's basketball tournament to UNLV. They were invited to the 2011 CollegeInsider.com Tournament which they lost in the second round to Santa Clara.

Roster

Schedule and results 

|-
!colspan=9 style=|Regular season

|-
!colspan=9 style=| Mountain West tournament

|-
!colspan=9 style=| CollegeInsider.com tournament

See also 
 2010–11 NCAA Division I men's basketball season
 2010–11 NCAA Division I men's basketball rankings

References 

Air Force
Air Force Falcons men's basketball seasons
Air Force
Air Force Falcons
Air Force Falcons